The Brat Pack is a nickname given to a group of young actors who frequently appeared together in teen-oriented coming-of-age films in the 1980s. First mentioned in a 1985 New York magazine article, it is now usually defined as the cast members of two specific films released in 1985—The Breakfast Club and St. Elmo's Fire—although other actors are sometimes included. The "core" members are considered to be Emilio Estevez, Anthony Michael Hall, Rob Lowe, Andrew McCarthy, Demi Moore, Judd Nelson, Molly Ringwald, and Ally Sheedy.

Membership
The term "Brat Pack", a play on the Rat Pack from the 1950s and 1960s, was first popularized in a 1985 New York magazine cover story, which described a group of highly successful film stars in their early twenties. David Blum wrote the article after witnessing several young actors (Emilio Estevez, Rob Lowe, and Judd Nelson) being mobbed by groupies at Los Angeles' Hard Rock Cafe. The group has been characterized by the partying of members Estevez, Lowe, and Nelson.

However, an appearance in one or both of the ensemble casts of John Hughes' The Breakfast Club and Joel Schumacher's St. Elmo's Fire is often considered the prerequisite for being a core Brat Pack member. With this criterion, the most commonly cited members include: 
 Emilio Estevez 
 Anthony Michael Hall 
 Rob Lowe 
 Andrew McCarthy
 Demi Moore
 Judd Nelson
 Molly Ringwald
 Ally Sheedy

Absent from most lists is Mare Winningham, the only principal member of either cast who never starred in any other films with any other cast members. Estevez was cited as the "unofficial president" of the Brat Pack. He and Demi Moore were once engaged. In 1999, McCarthy said he was never a member of the group: "The media made up this sort of tribe. I don't think I've seen any of these people since we finished St. Elmo's Fire."

The initial New York article covered a group of actors larger, or more inclusive, than the currently understood meaning of the term "Brat Pack". For example, most of the cast members of The Outsiders were mentioned, including Tom Cruise, C. Thomas Howell, Matt Dillon, Patrick Swayze, and Ralph Macchio, none of whom starred in any other 1980s movies with any "core" Brat Packers, besides Swayze. Charlie Sheen appears in several lists – more for his family relationship to Brat Pack leader Emilio Estevez and his partying than for his collaborative film work with other members.

James Spader and Robert Downey Jr. have also been considered members, and performed alongside other Brat Packers: both of them with Andrew McCarthy in Less than Zero; Spader with McCarthy in Mannequin, with Lowe in Bad Influence, and with McCarthy and Molly Ringwald in Pretty in Pink; and Downey with Anthony Michael Hall (Weird Science and Johnny Be Good; and the cast of Saturday Night Live) and with Molly Ringwald (The Pick-up Artist). Other actors who have been linked with the group include Kevin Bacon, Matthew Broderick, Jon Cryer, John Cusack, Joan Cusack, Nicolas Cage, Jami Gertz, Mary Stuart Masterson, Sean Penn, Kiefer Sutherland, and Lea Thompson. In her autobiography, Melissa Gilbert connects herself with the Brat Pack, as her social life centered on Estevez and Lowe (to each of whom she was engaged at different times). Through frequent collaborative work, the actor Harry Dean Stanton, then in his late 50s, became a mentor for the group of young actors.

Article
David Blum’s New York story, titled “Hollywood’s Brat Pack”, ran on June 10, 1985. It was originally supposed to be just about Emilio Estevez, but one night, Estevez invited Blum to hang out with him, Rob Lowe, Judd Nelson, and others at the Hard Rock Cafe. It was a typical night out for the group, who had gotten close while filming St. Elmo’s Fire. That night, Blum decided to change the article’s focus to an entire group of young actors at the time. The St. Elmo’s Fire crew members did not like Blum and sensed that he was jealous of the actors’ success.

When the piece ran, the actors all felt betrayed, especially Estevez. The article mentioned people in several films but focused on Estevez, Lowe, and Nelson, and portrayed those three negatively. The “Brat Pack” label, which the actors disliked, stuck for years afterward. Before the article ran, they had been regarded as talented individuals; after the article, all of them were grouped together and regarded as unprofessional. Interviewed for Susannah Gora’s 2010 book You Couldn’t Ignore Me If You Tried: The Brat Pack, John Hughes, And Their Impact on a Generation, Blum admitted that he should not have written the article.

With the increased negative attention to them, the actors soon stopped socializing with one another. On the group’s camaraderie, Ally Sheedy later said the article “just destroyed it. I had felt truly a part of something, and that guy just blew it to pieces.”

Legacy
During the late 1980s, several of the Brat Pack actors had their careers mildly derailed by problems relating to drugs, alcohol, and in Lowe's case, a sex tape. According to Susannah Gora, "Many believe they could have gone on to more serious roles if not for that article. They were talented. But they had professional difficulties, personal difficulties after that." By the 21st century, the term "Brat Pack" had lost its negative connotation.

The films themselves have been described as representative of "the socially apathetic, cynical, money-possessed and ideologically barren eighties generation." They made frequent use of adolescent archetypes, were often set in the suburbs surrounding Chicago, and focused on white, middle-class teenage angst. According to author Susannah Gora, these films "changed the way many young people looked at everything from class distinction to friendship, from love to sex and fashion to music." They are considered "among the most influential pop cultural contributions of their time."

In 2012, Entertainment Weekly listed The Breakfast Club as the best high school movie ever made. On VH1's list of the 100 greatest teen stars, Molly Ringwald was ranked No. 1, Rob Lowe was ranked No. 2, Anthony Michael Hall was ranked No. 4, Ally Sheedy was ranked No. 34, and Andrew McCarthy was ranked No. 40.

In 2020, Estevez expressed frustration at the persistence of the "Brat Pack" name, saying "That [term] will be on my tombstone ... It's annoying because Brad Pitt, George Clooney and Matt Damon have worked together more than any of us have. We just made two movies and somehow it morphed into something else."

Filmography
Beyond the two primary films, there is no generally accepted list of "Brat Pack" movies. While Blum's article credits Taps, a 1981 sleeper starring Timothy Hutton with Cruise and Penn, as the first Brat Pack movie, the list of movies below represents the more traditional filmography, with each movie including at least two core members in starring roles:

Other 1980s films, many with similar coming-of-age themes, that starred only one core Brat Pack actor with one or more close contributors include:
 Tex (1982) with Emilio Estevez and Matt Dillon
 WarGames (1983) with Ally Sheedy and Matthew Broderick
 Bad Boys (1983) with Ally Sheedy and Sean Penn
 Repo Man (1984) with Emilio Estevez and Olivia Barash
 No Small Affair (1984) with Demi Moore and Jon Cryer
 Heaven Help Us (1985) with Andrew McCarthy and Mary Stuart Masterson
 Weird Science (1985) with Anthony Michael Hall and Robert Downey Jr.
 One Crazy Summer (1986) with Demi Moore and John Cusack
 Youngblood (1986) with Rob Lowe and Patrick Swayze
 The Pick-up Artist (1987) with Molly Ringwald and Robert Downey Jr.
 Less than Zero (1987) with Andrew McCarthy, Jami Gertz, Robert Downey, Jr., and James Spader
Mannequin (1987) with Andrew McCarthy and James Spader
 Johnny Be Good (1988) with Anthony Michael Hall and Robert Downey Jr.
 Young Guns (1988) with Emilio Estevez, Charlie Sheen, and Kiefer Sutherland
 Kansas (1988) with Andrew McCarthy and Matt Dillon
 We're No Angels (1989) with Demi Moore and Sean Penn
 Young Guns II (1990) with Emilio Estevez and Kiefer Sutherland
 Bad Influence (1990) with Rob Lowe and James Spader

Some films have been dubbed "Brat Pack movies" despite having no stars from the core membership, including 1984's Red Dawn with C. Thomas Howell, Jennifer Grey, Charlie Sheen, Harry Dean Stanton, Patrick Swayze, and Lea Thompson, 1986's Ferris Bueller's Day Off which starred Matthew Broderick with Grey and Sheen in supporting roles and 1987's The Lost Boys with Kiefer Sutherland and Jami Gertz in key roles.

Later acting careers 
Many of the Brat Pack members have continued to act past the 1980s.

 Molly Ringwald continued acting in films throughout the 1990s and in 2001, began performing as Sally Bowles in the Broadway revival of Cabaret. In 2013, she released a jazz record called Except Sometimes. She also began starring in television shows such as The Secret Life of the American Teenager and Riverdale.
 Rob Lowe saw a massive downturn in his career following a 1988 sex tape scandal, while his opening number at the 61st Academy Awards further aggravated his image and career and eventually his film career declined. However, his career saw a resurgence when he ventured back into television with The West Wing and since has had significant roles in various television shows including Brothers & Sisters (2006–2010), Parks and Recreation (2010–2014), and currently stars on 9-1-1: Lone Star.
 Emilio Estevez and Judd Nelson also continued to act. Nelson has performed on three seasons of the show Suddenly Susan and Bad Kids Go to Hell. Estevez would star in several films, with the most notable being The Mighty Ducks trilogy, and would go on to have a career as a director.
 Ally Sheedy has acted, mostly in independent productions like Kyle XY, and also teaches at LaGuardia High School of Performing Arts. 
 Andrew McCarthy has acted steadily in smaller TV and film roles and later began directing TV shows such as Gossip Girl, The Blacklist starring James Spader and Orange Is the New Black. In 2022, he joined the cast of The Resident.
 Anthony Michael Hall eventually overcame his geeky persona by starring as Bill Gates in the 1999 television film Pirates of Silicon Valley as well as in the lead role of The Dead Zone (2002-2007) for six seasons.
 Demi Moore overcame the associated curse expeditiously when she starred in the blockbuster Ghost (1990). She followed this success with leading roles in consecutive box office hits: A Few Good Men (1992), Indecent Proposal (1993), Disclosure (1994) and by the mid-90s became the highest paid actress. However, her starring roles in The Scarlet Letter (1995), The Juror (1996), Striptease (1996), and G.I. Jane (1997) were widely panned and marked an end of her career as a leading actress.

Gallery

See also

 Brit Pack
 Child actor
 Dreamlanders
 Frat Pack
 Splat Pack
 Teen film
 Typecasting

References

External links
 
 
 
 
 
 
 
 

American male film actors
American film actresses
Groups of entertainers
Nicknames in film
1980s in film